Melnea Cass Boulevard is a street in Boston, Massachusetts, running perpendicular to the line between Dudley Square in Roxbury and the South End.  It is named after local community and civil rights activist Melnea Cass. The road's right-of-way was originally planned to be part of Interstate 695, until its cancellation. There is also an MBTA Silver Line station named Melnea Cass Boulevard on this street.

The boulevard's eastern terminus is at the Mass Ave Connector, intersects with the various major thoroughfares of Roxbury, and a few minor streets and ways, finally ending at the western terminus at Columbus Avenue behind Ruggles station and Northeastern University.  Melnea Cass Boulevard is primarily four lanes wide, with some exceptions for turning lanes at major cross streets.  Due to the history of Melnea Cass Boulevard being a planned right of way for the rejected Inner Belt, it is generally devoid of structures and buildings, except city-owned properties built in formerly unused lots.  The majority of adjacent buildings are at the corners of the major cross streets.

Cancelled planned renovation
The City of Boston began planning a complete rebuild of the street in 2011, publishing a plan in 2018 that would add separated bike lanes and raised crossings to improve safety on one of the city's most dangerous streets. It canceled the awarded $25.6 million contract for this rebuilding in January 2021 due to neighbor objections over the removal of mature trees.

Drug and homelessness issues

Due to its concentration of service providers, the area around the "Mass and Cass" intersection has attracted a large number of people dealing with homelessness and drug addiction, especially after the closure of the treatment facility on Long Island. The effects on local residents and the city's attempts to deal with the problem have generated considerable controversy, with the reconstruction of the bridge to Long Island delayed by opposition from the city of Quincy.

As of September 2021, there is a homeless community in the Melnea Cass Boulevard area, which has an area nicknamed "Methadone Mile" (after the opiate based drug used or treating opiate and opioid/heroin addiction). This was estimated to be over 100 residents in one concentration, mainly living in tents and structures.

It was referenced by Fergie the Florist in The Town (2010 film) as being the location where Doug MacRay's mother took her own life while under the influence of drugs.

See also
 Combat Zone
 Skid row

References

Homelessness in the United States
Streets in Boston